HVC may refer to:

HVC (avian brain region), an area in the avian brain involved in song production and vocal learning
HVC, the product code used by Nintendo for Famicom hardware and software in Japan
Haitian Vodou Culture Language (ISO 639-3 code)
High-velocity cloud, a common astronomical phenomenon
Himachal Vikas Congress, an Indian political party
Holographic Versatile Card, a piece of computer hardware
Hypervisor call, the interface between virtual machine software and a guest running under it.